Michael Chevalier (born 14 May 1933; died 2006) was a German voice actor born in Berlin. He provided the German dub voices for Charles Bronson (Once Upon a Time in the West), Richard Harris (The Wild Geese), Omar Sharif (Doctor Zhivago), Oliver Reed (Gladiator), Steve McQueen (The Cincinnati Kid), Dan Blocker (Bonanza) and William Conrad (Jake and the Fatman). He also provided dubs for Marlon Brando, Paul Newman and Sean Connery. From 2003, he withdrew from dubbing work and the public eye. In 2004, he received the German Prize for Synchronization for his outstanding overall work. Chevalier was the grandson of the painter Friedrich Klein-Chevalier.

He collaborated with the German trance/techno-band E Nomine on a number of their albums.

References

External links 

German male voice actors
German people of French descent
1933 births
2006 deaths